Brett Roberts (born March 24, 1970) is a former American basketball player best remembered for leading NCAA Division I in scoring as a senior in 1991–92 and then getting selected by the Sacramento Kings in that year's NBA draft, although he ultimately never played a game in the league. Roberts grew up in Portsmouth, Ohio and attended South Webster High School before moving on to play for Morehead State University's basketball team.

A  small forward, Roberts averaged 16.7 points per game for his four-year career. Through his first three seasons he averaged no more than around 14 points per game. Then, in his senior season in 1991–92, Roberts jumped from an average of 14.5 per game the year before to a nation-leading 28.1 points per game, doubling his output in a single season. He was named the Ohio Valley Conference Men's Basketball Player of the Year and was even selected in the NBA Draft.

Baseball career
Despite being drafted, Roberts never made any teams' final rosters. He eventually became the principal at his old high school, forgoing any professional aspirations. In 1991, Roberts was also selected by the Minnesota Twins in the fourth round (103rd overall) of the Major League Baseball amateur entry draft.

Teams
 Elizabethton Twins (1991)
 Kenosha Twins (1992)
 Fort Myers Miracle (1993–1994)
 Nashville Xpress (1994)
 Hardware City Rock Cats (1995)
 Salt Lake Buzz (1996–1997)
 Fargo-Moorhead Redhawks (1997)

See also
List of NCAA Division I men's basketball season scoring leaders

References

1970 births
Living people
Baseball players from Ohio
Basketball players from Ohio
Elizabethton Twins players
Fargo-Moorhead RedHawks players
Fort Myers Miracle players
Hardware City Rock Cats players
High school basketball coaches in the United States
Kenosha Twins players
Morehead State Eagles baseball players
Morehead State Eagles men's basketball players
Nashville Xpress players
People from Portsmouth, Ohio
Sacramento Kings draft picks
Salt Lake Buzz players
Small forwards
American men's basketball players